The 1980 Australian Sports Sedan Championship was open to drivers of Sports Sedans complying with CAMS Group B regulations. The title was contested over an eleven-round series
Round 1, Oran Park Raceway, New South Wales, 23 March
Round 2, Winton Motor Raceway, Victoria, 4 May
Round 3, Amaroo Park, New South Wales, 25 May
Round 4, Wanneroo Park, Western Australia, 8 June
Round 5, Lakeside International Raceway, Queensland, 22 June
Round 6, Calder Park Raceway, Victoria, 3 August
Round 7, Surfers Paradise, Queensland, 31 August
Round 8, Symmons Plains, Tasmania, 21 September
Round 9, Baskerville, Tasmania, 12 October
Round 10, The Advertiser Sports Sedan Challenge, Adelaide International Raceway, South Australia, 19 October
Round 11, Sandown Raceway, Victoria, 14 December
Points were awarded on a 9-6-4-3-2-1 basis to the top six outright placegetters in each round. Only the best nine scores could be retained by each driver although this had no effect on the nett pointscores.

Results

References

Australian Motor Racing Yearbook, 1980/81
CAMS Manual of Motor Sport, 1980
Official Program, Adelaide International Raceway, Sunday, 19 October 1980
Racing Car News, February 1981
The Australian Racing History of Ford,  © 1989
The Official Racing History of Holden, © 1988
Autopics
CAMS Manual

National Sports Sedan Series
Sports Sedan Championship